Slough Press is an American small press publisher that specializes in unique literature in all genres, publishing since 1973 from Texas in Austin, Dallas, and College Station. The mission of Slough Press aims to publish novels/fiction, poetry, and non-fiction by writers from backgrounds that mainstream publishers ignore or marginalize. The press has a reputation for publishing authors from Cajun or Chicano backgrounds. Most Slough authors are from the American South or Southwest.

History
Charles "Chuck" Taylor, Jr. founded Slough Press with Susan Bright in 1973, after moving to Texas from the Midwest. Taylor moved the press to El Paso when he was hired at the University of Texas at El Paso. Bright left the press at this time and later founded Plain View Press in Austin. As of 2017, Slough Press was operating out of Austin.

Since its beginnings, several Slough authors have received major awards and been published by bigger presses to gain national recognition, including Marion Winik, Pat Littledog, and Mick White. Some of the most popular writers of the hundreds published since its beginnings include Ricardo Sánchez, Hedwig Gorski, and most recently Christopher Carmona. The press remains faithful to its regional writers across genres. Slough also published satirical Latino poet José Montalvo's collections Black Hat Poems (1987) and Welcome to My New World (1992).

Slough does not charge authors fees or running contests to collect funds.

Publishing

 Hedwig Gorski. Intoxication: Heathcliff on Powell Street (2006). 
 Carmona, Christopher. Beat (2011). 
Sánchez, Gabrielle H. The Fluid Chicano (2015).  
Littledog, Pat. Afoot in a Field of Men, Special Anniversary Edition (2015).

Notes and references

External links 
Official website
Plain View Press

Book publishing companies based in Texas
Publishing companies established in 1973
1973 establishments in Texas